The Australian Festival of Chamber Music (AFCM) is a ten-day international festival focused on chamber music held in Townsville, North Queensland commencing on the last Friday in July. The AFCM also incorporates a Winterschool for emerging artists. Some 30 to 40 chamber musicians from around Australia and the world converge on Townsville, each year to perform and teach emerging artists.

The festival was founded in July 1991 and has been held annually ever since. In 2020 it celebrated its 30th anniversary. It is the largest festival dedicated to chamber music in the southern hemisphere.

The AFCM is presented in partnership with all three levels of government as well as several commercial, tourism, regional development, and educational, organisations. The festival's patron is Paul de Jersey, Governor of Queensland.

History
The festival was founded in 1990 for a 1991 premiere by Professor Ray Golding, the then Vice-Chancellor of James Cook University and Theodore Kuchar who continued as the artistic director for the next 16 years until 2006. The festival began conservatively focusing on the more contemporary music of the classical and romantic periods, over the first five years Kuchar started inserting works of Bartok, Bloch, Martinu, Shostakovich, expanding the musical depth for enthusiasts while maintaining the popular appeal.

The festival has tried to avoid a perception that it is only there for cultivated southerners, for example in 2005 for the first time the AFCM had a presence at a Cowboys football match and in 2006 increased publicity focusing locally.

2007 Australian Festival of Chamber Music 
In 2007 the AFCM gained a new artistic director in Piers Lane AO. Lane, an Australian, a leading international pianist who is based in London; The 2007 programme involved vocalists and more variety than previous years to appeal to a broader audience, taking a "lifestyle approach" and focussing on music, wine and food.

2017 Australian Festival of Chamber Music 
The 2017 Festival – the last under Piers Lane, was the highest box off results on record.

2018 Australian Festival of Chamber Music 
In 2018 Piers Lane AO. Lane. passed the Artistic Directorship to his friend and colleague, Kathryn Stott, also a leading international pianist based in Manchester; The 2018 programme & Festival was a resounding success with the second highest box office on record.

2022 Australian Festival of Chamber Music 
In 2022 British/German violinist, director and festival director Jack Liebeck will deliver his first program as artistic director.  Located in Townsville the festival runs 29th July-7 August 2022  Incoming Artistic Director Jack Liebeck has created a truly exciting program for his first Festival. It is innovative and contemporary whilst still showcasing the classic composers and favourite works of chamber music through the centuries.

There are some new elements too, including what he's describing as

 Guilty Pleasures – musicians playing their all time favourite piece (classical or other), 
 AFCM Illuminates – informative lectures connecting music to science, and 
 Festival Garden – an informal outdoor space for listening to music and enjoying food and wine.

The 2022 Festival Program was unveiled on Tuesday 1 March.

AFCM Friends Priority Booking Period – commenced 10am AEDT, Tuesday 1 February and closed at 5pm, Wednesday 23 February 2022.

General Public Ticket Sales – commenced 10am AEDT, Tuesday 1 March 2022.

2023 Australian Festival of Chamber Music 
The 2023 Festival is scheduled for 28 July 2023 – 6 August 2023. The Festival will once again have Jack Liebeck as the Artistic Director.

1 February 2023 – Tickets on sale for AFCM Friends

1 March 2023 – Tickets on sale for everyone

Audience
Festival attendance has reached over 17,000 in recent years, with the free concert in the park attracting close to 5,000 attendees. About 60% of the Festival audience are visitors to Townsville, mostly intrastate and interstate visitors. International guests make up 2-3% of the audience.

Winterschool
An important element of the festival is its education program. The AFCM Winterschool provides young emerging musicians and school students with coaching and development opportunities. Masterclasses by visiting musicians are offered as part of the Winterschool program. Each year approximately 25 tertiary level music students attend the Advanced Winterschool program.  Entry to the program is by application. Entries usually open in January and close by May.

2022 Winterschool 
The Winterschool Director is Lloyd Van’t Hoff:  Lauded by Limelight Magazine for his "life-affirming music-making", Lloyd Van’t Hoff enjoys a career as a vibrant young clarinettist, chamber musician, collaborator and educator. Having been crowned the 2015 ABC Symphony Australia Young Performer of the Year, Lloyd regularly performs as a concerto soloist and tutti player with many of Australia’s symphony orchestras and as a soloist and chamber musician at festivals and venues around Australia and the globe.

Day off activities 
Each year the Festival has a "day-off" during which festival patrons have an opportunity to hear chamber music but in more unusual settings.

Orpheus Island Cruise 
The Orpheus Island Cruise has been one of the highlights for festival patrons. En route to Orpheus Island, whales have been often cited in the waters around the Palm Island group. Upon arrival at the remote end of Orpheus Island, patrons can enjoy the secluded beach and adjacent national park before settling down for a short performance from festival artists. The first tour to Orpheus Island took place in 2013 and was repeated in 2016 and each year since.

Outback Tour
From 2002 to 2010, the Outback Tour brought some of the best music in the world to some of the most isolated places in the world. In 2006 enthusiastic music lovers, join six musicians (including didgeridoo player William Barton) in a five-day tour of Outback Australia, visiting Cloncurry, Ernest Henry Mine, Mount Isa, Normanton and Karumba focusing on fine food and music and masterclasses with hands on experience of the Queensland mining industry and communities. Works included; Peter Sculthorpe – String Quartet No. 9; Philip Glass – String Quartet No. 2 Company; Hardin (aka Moondog) – Synchrony No. 2; Lee – Morango – Like a Tango; Barton – Sacred Song and Hindson – Technologic.

See also

List of Australian music festivals

References

Music festivals in Australia
1991 establishments in Australia
Townsville
Chamber music festivals
Festivals in Queensland
Recurring events established in 1991